The San Pietro is a former Roman Catholic church in Vitorchiano in the province of Viterbo, region of Lazio, Italy. The main attraction is the foliated Romanesque-style columns in the portal. The peperino stone facade is otherwise undecorated.

References

Pietro
Romanesque architecture in Lazio
Churches in the province of Viterbo